In 2013, Amazon.com began distributing original television shows through its Amazon Prime Video service, some of which are developed in-house by Amazon Studios.

Original programming

Drama

Comedy

Animation

Adult animation

Anime

Kids & family

Non-English language scripted

French

German

Hindi

Italian

Japanese

Portuguese

Spanish

Tamil

Other

Unscripted

Docuseries

Reality

Variety

Co-productions
These shows have been commissioned by Amazon in cooperation with a partner network.

Continuations
These shows have been picked up by Amazon for additional seasons after having aired previous seasons on another network.

Specials

Regional original programming

Drama

Comedy

Unscripted

Docuseries

Reality

Co-productions

Continuations

Upcoming original programming

Drama

Comedy

Animation

Kids & family

Adult animation

Non-English language scripted

French

German

Japanese

Spanish

Other

Unscripted

Docuseries

Reality

Variety

Co-productions

Continuations

In development

Pilots not picked up to series

Notes

References

Amazon
Amazon
Amazon (company)